Michael Fifi'i (born 24 December 1987) is a Solomon Islands international footballer who began playing for the Lupe ole Soaga in 2016.

Career
In 2007, he began his professional career for the Canterbury United FC. Later he played for the Team Wellington, Canterbury United FC and Miramar Rangers. Since 2014 he is a player of the Kiwi F.C.

Honours
New Zealand Football Championship:
Runners-up (1): 2011/2012
Samoa National League:
Champion (1): 2014.

References

External links
 
 

1987 births
Living people
Association football midfielders
Solomon Islands international footballers
Solomon Islands expatriate footballers
Solomon Islands footballers
Expatriate association footballers in New Zealand
Canterbury United players
Team Wellington players
Miramar Rangers AFC players
Expatriate footballers in Samoa
Kiwi FC players
Solomon Islands expatriate sportspeople in New Zealand
Solomon Islands expatriate sportspeople in Samoa